Thurston Williams (3 February 1924 – 18 February 1985) was a British architect. His work was part of the architecture event in the art competition at the 1948 Summer Olympics.

References

1924 births
1985 deaths
20th-century British architects
Olympic competitors in art competitions
People from Bromley